Edward, Ed, or Ted Barnes may refer to:

Arts and entertainment
 Edward Barnes (poet and translator) ( 1760–1795), Welsh poet and translator of poetry
 Edward Shippen Barnes (1887–1958), American organist
 Edward Larrabee Barnes (1915–2004), American architect
 Edward Barnes (television executive) (1928–2021), British television executive specialising in children's programming
 Edward Barnes (composer) (born 1958), American composer and producer
 Ted Barnes (fl. 2002–2009), British folk guitarist
 Edward Barnes (Upstairs, Downstairs), fictional character in the 1970s British TV series, Upstairs, Downstairs

Sports
 Edward Barnes (cricketer) (1856–1897), New Zealand cricketer
 Vet Barnes (Ed Barnes, fl. 1938), American baseball player
 Ed Barnes (rugby union) (born 1981), English rugby union player
 Ed Barnes (cricketer) (born 1997), English cricketer

Others
 Edward Barnes (British Army officer) (1776–1838), British soldier and governor of Ceylon
 Edward Barnes (1892–1941), professor of chemistry and amateur botanist in India